Purvis Young (February 4, 1943 – April 20, 2010) was an American artist from the Overtown neighborhood of Miami, Florida. Young's work, often a blend of collage and painting, utilizes found objects and the experience of African Americans in the south. Young gained recognition as a cult contemporary artist, with a collectors' following that included Jane Fonda, Damon Wayans, Jim Belushi, Dan Aykroyd, and others. In 2006 a feature documentary titled Purvis of Overtown was produced about his life and work. His work is found in the collections of the American Folk Art Museum, the Corcoran Gallery of Art, the High Museum of Art, the National Museum of African American History and Culture, the Philadelphia Museum of Art, and others. In 2018, he was inducted into the Florida Artists Hall of Fame.

Early life and work
Purvis Young was born in Liberty City, a neighborhood of Miami, Florida, on February 2, 1943. As a young boy, his uncle introduced him to drawing, but Young lost interest quickly. He never attended high school.

As a teenager, Young served three years (1961–64) in prison at North Florida's Raiford State Penitentiary for breaking and entering. While in prison he would regain his interest in art and began drawing and studying art books. When released, he began to produce thousands of small drawings, which he kept in shopping carts and later glued into discarded books and magazines that he found on the streets. He proceeded to move into the Overtown neighborhood of Miami. Young became attracted to a vacant alley called Goodbread Alley, which was named after the Jamaican bakeries that once occupied the street; he started living there in 1971.

Mid-career
In the early 1970s, Young found inspiration in the mural movements of Chicago and Detroit, and decided to create a mural of inspiration Overtown. He had never painted before, but inspiration struck and he began to create paintings and nailing them to the boarded up storefronts that formed the alley. He painted on wood he found on the streets and occasionally paintings would "disappear" from the wall, but Young didn't mind. About two years after starting the mural, tourists started visiting the alley, mainly white tourists. Occasionally, Young sold paintings to visitors - tourists and collectors alike - right off the wall. The mural garnered media attention, including the attention of millionaire Bernard Davis, owner of the Miami Art Museum. Davis became a patron of Young, providing him with painting supplies as well. Davis died in 1973, leaving Young a local celebrity in Miami.

Late career and death

In the late 1990s and early 2000s, he explored other inspirations by watching historical documentaries about war, the Great Depression, commerce, and Native American conflicts and struggles in the United States. In 1999 the Rubell family, notable art collectors from New York and creators of the Rubell Museum, purchased the entire content of Young's studio, a collection of almost 3,000 pieces. In 2008 the Rubells donated 108 works to Morehouse College In January 2007, Purvis was selected as the Art Miami Fair's Director's Choice Exhibition, sponsored by Grace Cafe and Galleries and the Bergman Collection, at the Miami Beach Convention Center. Young also helped to establish a number of outdoor art fairs in South Florida that continue today.

With artistic success came monetary gain, and Young failed to maintain his estate. Before his death, he became involved in a legal battle with former manager Martin Siskind. Young sued Siskind for mismanagement of funds. In response, Siskind successfully petitioned for Young to be declared mentally incompetent, and Young's affairs were placed in control of legal guardians. According to friends, Young was not incompetent and was left destitute by the procedures. Siskind stated that he and Young had settled the suit amicably and that Young retained ownership of 1,000 paintings and was financially stable.

Young suffered from diabetes, and toward the latter years of his life, he had other health problems, undergoing a kidney transplant in 2007. He died on April 20, 2010 in Miami, from cardiac arrest and pulmonary edema. He is survived by his two sisters Betty Rodriguez and Shirley Byrd, and his brother Irvin Byrd. There are conflicting reports about his relationship with Eddie Mae Lovest, the primary beneficiary of his will. According to some sources, she was his partner; however, Lovest herself has stated that they "never was married. Never was boyfriend and girlfriend." Instead, she says of the relationship that they were "the best of friends".

In 2015, The Bass Museum of Art announced that it is donating almost 400 pieces of Young's art to the permanent collection in the Black Archives History and Research Foundation of South Florida. The foundation is located in Lyric Theater in Overtown.

Work

Young found strong influence in Western art history and voraciously absorbed books from his nearby public library by Rembrandt, Vincent van Gogh, Gauguin, El Greco, Daumier and Picasso. His work was vibrant and colorful, and was described as appearing like fingerpainting. Reoccurring themes in his work were angels, wild horses, and urban landscapes. Through his works, he expressed social and racial issues, and served as an outspoken activist about politics and bureaucracy. He is credited with influencing the art movement terms social expressionism or urban expressionism.

In 2016, the records of art collector and dealer Jimmy Hedges and his Rising Fawn Folk Art Gallery were donated to the Smithsonian Archives of American Art on behalf of the Hedges Descendants Trust. Known as The Jimmy Hedges Papers, the file includes artist files, correspondence, photographs, and other materials documenting Hedges's interactions with hundreds of artists, whose homes and studios he visited, including Young. A 2018 addition to the papers consists of two linear feet of materials relating to Young, including photographs, biographical material, correspondence, notes, business records, and printed material.

In 2018, during the Art Basel/Miami Art week, Purvis Young was presented at the Japour Family Collection, and an entire floor of the Rubell Collection was dedicated to his works. Two Purvis Young works appear on the 2018 David Byrne album American Utopia.

Reception
Suzanne Khalil, curator of EXOR Galleries in Boca Raton, described him as an "urban storyteller", who created "raw" work. Morehouse president Robert Michael Franklin stated "Purvis Young has used his art as social commentary and a catalyst for justice."

Public collections 
Centre Pompidou
Los Angeles County Museum of Art
Metropolitan Museum of Art
Minneapolis Institute of Art
National Gallery of Art
Smithsonian
Whitney
Tampa Museum of Art

Exhibitions 

 Miami Beach Art Basel 2018
 Tampa Museum of Art 2022-2024

Notes

References

 Arnett, Paul, & William S. Arnett. Souls Grown Deep, Vol. 1: African American Vernacular Art of the South. Tinwood Books: Atlanta (2000). 

1943 births
2010 deaths
Artists from Miami
20th-century American painters
20th-century American male artists
American male painters
21st-century American painters
21st-century American male artists
African-American contemporary artists
American contemporary artists
American contemporary painters
Painters from Florida
Deaths from pulmonary edema
20th-century African-American painters
21st-century African-American artists